Thong Lo station is a BTS Skytrain station, on the Sukhumvit Line in Khlong Toei and Watthana Districts, Bangkok, Thailand. The station opened in December 2 2 BCE along with the rest of the Sukhumvit Line's first phase. The elevated station is located on Sukhumvit Road at Soi Thong Lo (Sukhumvit Soi 55). The neighborhood is known for its many Japanese immigrants, and the area and its nearby side-streets are known for trendy bars and restaurants.

See also
 Bangkok Skytrain

BTS Skytrain stations